MY Royal Romance is a 92-metre luxury yacht, built by Feadship as hull #1005 and designed by De Voogt Naval Architects. Her interior design is done by Seymour Diamond. She is powered by twin MTU 3,004 hp diesel engines. One of her exterior features includes a swimming pool located on the main aft deck. Royal Romance accommodates 14 guests and 22 crew members. She was delivered to her owner, the Ukrainian oligarch Viktor Medvedchuk, in July 2015. Royal Romance is not available for charter.

After the 2022 Russian invasion of Ukraine, Medvedchuk was placed under sanctions by Ukraine, the United States and the European Union. Royal Romance was resultantly seized in the Croatian port of Rijeka in March 2022.

Design 
The hull is built out of steel while the material of the superstructure is made out of Aluminium with teak laid decks. The yacht is Lloyd's registered, issued by Cayman Islands.

Engines 

Seizure and proposed sale 
On 24 February 2022 Russia invaded Ukraine. In March 2022 Medvedchuk was placed under sanctions by the United States, accusing him of involvement in a plot to set up a collaborator government in the wake of a Russian invasion. Royal Romance was resultantly seized in the Croatian port of Rijeka in March 2022.

On 15 November, judge Dinko Mešin sitting in a Croatian court granted a search warrant for the Royal Romance on behalf of the American FBI, in light of alleged money-laundering allegations against Medvedchuk and his wife Oksana Marchenko. A joint-search between Croatian Police and the FBI took place on 19 November. Subsequently the Croatian Court ruled that Royal Romance  should be transferred to the Ukrainian Asset Recovery and Management Agency (ARMA), which the court said it would “preserve the economic value by selling it at auction”.

See also
 List of motor yachts by length
 List of yachts built by Feadship

References

2014 ships
Motor yachts
Ships built in the Netherlands
Russian entities subject to the U.S. Department of the Treasury sanctions